Emmanuel Nyitsse is an Anglican  bishop in Nigeria: he is the current Bishop of Gboko one of 13 dioceses within the Anglican Province of Abuja, itself one of 14 provinces within the Church of Nigeria.

Notes

Living people
Anglican bishops of Gboko
21st-century Anglican bishops in Nigeria
Year of birth missing (living people)